The Catholic–Gallaudet rivalry is a rivalry in both football and basketball between the Catholic University Cardinals and Gallaudet Bison. Both institutions are based in Washington, D.C. In 2012, Gallaudet defeated Catholic 47–27 for its first ever victory in the series. The two teams have met only three times since 1994, but prior to that is a lengthy, one-sided rivalry. The series dates back to 1906.

See also  
 List of NCAA college football rivalry games

References

College football rivalries in the United States
Gallaudet Bison football
Catholic University Cardinals football
1906 establishments in Washington, D.C.